Bezirk Hollabrunn is a district of the state of 
Lower Austria in Austria.

Municipalities
Towns (Städte) are indicated in boldface; market towns (Marktgemeinden) in italics; suburbs, hamlets and other subdivisions of a municipality are indicated in small characters.
 Alberndorf im Pulkautal
 Göllersdorf
 Bergau, Eitzersthal, Furth, Göllersdorf, Großstelzendorf, Obergrub, Oberparschenbrunn, Porrau, Schönborn, Untergrub, Viendorf, Wischathal
 Grabern
 Mittergrabern, Obergrabern, Ober-Steinabrunn, Schöngrabern, Windpassing
 Guntersdorf
 Großnondorf, Guntersdorf
 Hadres
 Hadres, Obritz, Untermarkersdorf
 Hardegg
 Felling, Hardegg, Heufurth, Mallersbach, Merkersdorf, Niederfladnitz, Pleißing, Riegersburg, Waschbach
 Haugsdorf
 Auggenthal, Haugsdorf, Jetzelsdorf, Kleinhaugsdorf
 Heldenberg
 Glaubendorf, Großwetzdorf, Kleinwetzdorf, Oberthern, Unterthern
 Hohenwarth-Mühlbach am Manhartsberg
 Bösendürnbach, Ebersbrunn, Hohenwarth, Mühlbach am Manhartsberg, Olbersdorf, Ronthal, Zemling
 Hollabrunn
 Altenmarkt im Thale, Aspersdorf, Breitenwaida, Dietersdorf, Eggendorf im Thale, Enzersdorf im Thale, Groß Hollabrunn, Kleedorf, Kleinkadolz, Kleinstelzendorf, Kleinstetteldorf, Magersdorf, Mariathal, Oberfellabrunn, Puch, Raschala, Sonnberg, Suttenbrunn, Weyerburg, Wieselsfeld, Wolfsbrunn
 Mailberg
 Mailberg, Eggendorf am Walde, Grübern, Gumping, Klein-Burgstall, Limberg, Maissau, Oberdürnbach, Reikersdorf, Unterdürnbach, Wilhelmsdorf
 Maissau
 Nappersdorf-Kammersdorf
 Dürnleis, Haslach, Kammersdorf, Kleinsierndorf, Kleinweikersdorf, Nappersdorf
 Pernersdorf
 Karlsdorf, Peigarten, Pernersdorf, Pfaffendorf, Ragelsdorf
 Pulkau
 Groß-Reipersdorf, Leodagger, Passendorf, Pulkau, Rafing, Rohrendorf an der Pulkau, Dopinghofen
 Ravelsbach
 Baierdorf, Gaindorf, Minichhofen, Oberravelsbach, Parisdorf, Pfaffstetten, Ravelsbach
 Retz
 Hofern, Kleinhöflein, Kleinriedenthal, Obernalb, Retz, Unternalb
 Retzbach
 Mitterretzbach, Oberretzbach, Unterretzbach
 Schrattenthal
 Obermarkersdorf, Schrattenthal, Waitzendorf
 Seefeld-Kadolz
 Großkadolz, Seefeld
 Sitzendorf an der Schmida
 Braunsdorf, Frauendorf an der Schmida, Goggendorf, Kleinkirchberg, Niederschleinz, Pranhartsberg, Roseldorf, Sitzendorf an der Schmida, Sitzenhart
 Wullersdorf
 Aschendorf, Grund, Hart, Hetzmannsdorf, Immendorf, Kalladorf, Maria Roggendorf, Oberstinkenbrunn, Schalladorf, Wullersdorf
 Zellerndorf
 Deinzendorf, Dietmannsdorf, Pillersdorf, Platt, Watzelsdorf, Zellerndorf
 Ziersdorf
 Dippersdorf, Fahndorf, Gettsdorf, Großmeiseldorf, Hollenstein, Kiblitz, Radlbrunn, Rohrbach, Ziersdorf

 
Districts of Lower Austria